A mandora is a cross of mandarin and orange, grown on Cyprus.

It is easily mistaken for a clementine, but its skin is tougher and the fruit contains seeds. The taste is more acidic than the clementine's.

The fruit's appearance looks much like an orange, with a rough orange outside and a juicy, seedy inside.  It is tougher to peel than a clementine.

The season of the mandora is from January to April.

References

External links
 Mandora Cyprus

Oranges (fruit)
Citrus hybrids